"Nightrider" is a song from Electric Light Orchestra's (ELO) album Face the Music.

The song's title is a titular tip of the hat to Lynne's first major band, The Nightriders. This was the third single released from the album after "Evil Woman", in 1976. The B-side on the single was a live version of "Daybreaker" taken from the 1974 live album The Night the Light Went On in Long Beach. Despite ELO's rising popularity, the song failed to chart. The song was also included as the B-side on the US hit single "Do Ya".

Between 3:16 and 3:19, the song features a string crescendo which was reused (played backwards, from 2:40 to 2:44) on another of the album's tracks, "Evil Woman".

"I took the high string part of Nightrider that climbs up to a climax, and used it backwards in Evil Woman as a big effect. I was amazed when it slotted in seamlessly."
- Jeff Lynne (Face the Music remaster liner notes)

During live performances, Jeff Lynne and Kelly Groucutt would swap vocals during the song.

References

1976 singles
Electric Light Orchestra songs
Jet Records singles
Song recordings produced by Jeff Lynne
Songs written by Jeff Lynne
United Artists Records singles